Pierre Raffeix (1633–1724) was a French Jesuit missionary in Canada.

He was born at Clermont-Ferrand, entered the Society of Jesus in 1653, and came to Canada in 1663. In 1668 he established near Montreal a settlement for converted Iroquois (now Kahnawake).

In 1671 he replaced Étienne de Carheil in the Cayuga mission, and afterwards went to the Seneca Indians until 1680.

Raffeix was a cartographer, as the following surviving maps bear witness:

"Carte des regions les plus occidentales du Canada", dated 1676, and bearing a legend relating to the voyage of discovery of Jacques Marquette and Louis Joliet;
"Le lac Ontario avec les pays adjacents et surtout les cinq nations iroquoises"; 
"La Nouvelle-France, de l'Océan au lac Erié, et, au sud, jusqu'à la Nouvelle-Angleterre".

After his return to Quebec he acted as procurator to the mission. He spent two years at Jeune-Lorette (1699–1700), shortly after the final migration of the remnants of the Huron nation.  He died at Quebec.

References
 
 
 

1633 births
1724 deaths
17th-century French Jesuits
French Roman Catholic missionaries
Roman Catholic missionaries in Canada
18th-century French Jesuits
French cartographers
Jesuit missionaries in New France
Clergy from Clermont-Ferrand